Otisco is an unincorporated community in Otisco Township, Waseca County, Minnesota, United States, near New Richland and Waseca.  The community is located near the junction of Waseca County Road 15 and State Highway 13 (MN 13).

Otisco was platted in 1877 when the Minneapolis and St. Louis Railway was extended to that point.

References  

Unincorporated communities in Waseca County, Minnesota
Unincorporated communities in Minnesota